The Unshrinkable Jerry Mouse is a 1964 short directed and produced by Chuck Jones, with a plot by Jones and Michael Maltese. The title's a play on The Unsinkable Molly Brown, a Broadway musical that was made into a film the same year. The short is a Claude Cat and Marc Antony and Pussyfoot short reworked for Tom and Jerry. The gags were inspired by other shorts, such as Feline Frame-Up, Feed the Kitty, and Two's a Crowd, which were written by Maltese and directed by Jones.

Plot 
Tom wakes up in his basket and gets Jerry, tied to the basket with string, to fetch him a glass of milk, which Tom drinks through a straw pacifier like if he was a baby, and gets Jerry to massage him. Tom then picks Jerry up, pats him on the head for his work, and flips him back to his hole until the next time he was needed. A small package is then delivered to the house, with Tom lazily believing it to be food for him from his owner, only to get standup shocked when he heard the meow of another cat in the house.  It turned out that the package had a cute red and white kitten which instantly wins Jerry's heart, but Tom takes an instant disliking to her.

As Jerry stares at the kitten as he is thinking "I love kittens!", Tom flips him back to his hole again. Tom deliberates on how to get rid of the kitten, because to him, one cat in the house is heaven, but two cats will just be a living hell for him. When the owner leaves to get food for the kitten, Tom grabs the kitten. Jerry hears the loud cry of the kitten and becomes angry. Jerry manages to remove himself from the string and uses it as a lasso to save the kitten. Jerry traps Tom's foot before he can kick the kitten out of the window, making him release the kitten. The kitten flies through the air, but Jerry catches her in a pillow to make her land safely. Jerry pats the kitten, as she thanks the mouse by licking him.

Tom, angry, chases Jerry, who carries the kitten. Tom grabs the kitten, unbeknownst to Jerry, who bumps into a table leg. Jerry catches a plate and throws it at Tom's foot, making Tom spin, and again catches the kitten. Tom spins out of the window, and Jerry locks him out of the house to prevent him from bothering the kitten again. As Jerry and the kitten nap, an extremely mad Tom bangs on the window and threatens Jerry to get rid of the kitten and him if he didn't cooperate, but Jerry ignores him and taunts him further by feeding the kitten milk from the straw pacifier.

Irritated by Jerry's defiance, Tom attempts to barge through the door, but Jerry opens the door and puts a banana peel on the floor. Tom avoids it and sticks out his tongue at Jerry, but lands onto a roller skate while pushing his tongue back in his mouth, which sends him rolling into the basement. Tom then climbs back up, slides on the banana peel towards the outside, and gets stuck in a wooden garden gate. Tom tries to jump through the upper-level window since the board gives him some air, but due to the board being stuck around his waist, he gets stuck in the window that falls shut on him.

Jerry quickly locks the window and rubs his hands and chuckles evilly. Jerry has decided that as punishment for both his cruelty to the kitten and forcing him into slavery that Tom needs a good spanking. And he takes advantage of Tom's compromising situation to do just that. Next, we see the scene from outside. Jerry has tied Tom's tail up high with a string so that he has unobstructed access to Tom's behind, effectively baring his bottom. Then he picks up a paddle (twice his own size) and carefully and deliberately takes aim. Taking his time and letting Tom think about what is about to happen. We see Tom on the inside sweating as he can see out the window. Jerry then begins spanking Tom's bare bottom hard and merciless with the paddle. This happens off-screen, only Tom's expressions of pain are shown from inside. The first three swats are slow to let it sink in as Tom tries to endure the sting, followed by a flurry of swats to drive Tom to tears. Then, from outside again, we see Tom's big red mark being left on his bare behind, blinking like a red warning light, throbbing in pain from the bare butt blistering, and Tom waves a white flag to signal his surrender knowing there is nothing he can do to prevent another spanking.

After his surrender, he is then forced to act as a slave for Jerry and the kitten. She happily sips milk from the pacifier straw, as if she were a baby, and Jerry receives a shoulder massage from a disgruntled Tom. Jerry then waves goodbye at the audience while the cartoon irises out.

Crew 
Story: Michael Maltese & Chuck Jones
Animation: Don Towsley, Tom Ray, Dick Thompson, Ben Washam & Ken Harris
Backgrounds: Philip DeGuard
Vocal Effects: Mel Blanc & June Foray
In Charge of Production: Les Goldman
Co-Director & Layouts: Maurice Noble
Music: Eugene Poddany
Produced & Directed by Chuck Jones

External links 

1964 short films
1964 animated films
1964 films
1960s animated short films
Tom and Jerry short films
Short films directed by Chuck Jones
Films directed by Maurice Noble
Films scored by Eugene Poddany
1960s American animated films
1964 comedy films
Animated films without speech
American comedy short films
Metro-Goldwyn-Mayer short films
Metro-Goldwyn-Mayer animated short films
MGM Animation/Visual Arts short films
Films with screenplays by Michael Maltese
1960s English-language films